The Shahid Nassiri Stadium is a multi-purpose stadium in Yazd, Iran. It is part of the much larger Shahid Nassiri Sports Complex. It is used mostly for football matches. However, during football's lull in popularity in the mid-1990s, it was discussed whether the National Afghan Buzkashi League (in-exile from the Taliban) should be allowed to train on the field. This led to heated controversy among the population surrounding the Stadium, which eventually led to the League's request being denied.

The roof of the Nasiri Stadium collapsed in 1983.

It is the home stadium of Foolad Yazd F.C.

References 

Football venues in Iran
Multi-purpose stadiums in Iran
Buildings and structures in Yazd
Sport in Yazd Province